The Jakopič Award, also known as the Rihard Jakopič Award ( or Nagrada Riharda Jakopiča) is an art award in Slovenia awarded each year for achievements in the fine arts children's literature. It has been bestowed since 1969 by the Ljubljana Academy of Fine Arts and Design, the Museum of Modern Art and the Slovene Fine Artists' Association. It is awarded on 12 April, the anniversary of the birth of the painter Rihard Jakopič after whom it is named.

Levstik Award laureates

See also 

List of European art awards

Notes and references

 
Slovenian art awards
Awards established in 1969
1969 establishments in Yugoslavia